The Al-Menber National Islamic Society is the political wing of the Sunni Islamist Al Eslah Society in Bahrain and Bahrain's branch of the Muslim Brotherhood. The president and patron of the Al Eslah Society is Shaikh Isa bin Mohammed Al Khalifa, a member of the Al Khalifa royal family and former labor minister of Bahrain. Prominent members of Al-Menber include Salah Abdulrahman, Salah Al Jowder, and outspoken MP Mohammed Khalid. The party has generally backed government-sponsored legislation on economic issues, but has sought a clampdown on pop concerts, sorcery and soothsayers. Additionally, it has strongly opposed the government's accession to the International Covenant on Civil and Political Rights.

A Sunni Islamic party, it is well organised through a network of mosques and seek to promote a conservative social agenda while not directly challenging the Kingdom's government. It became a political society in 2006. Bahrain does not allow political parties by traditional definition. Before that it was merely a think tank and public affair society.

The group often cooperates with the salafi political bloc Asalah, especially on issues involving religious affairs and morals. Minbar seeks a personal status law that conforms to Sharia and is acceptable to both sects. At times, Al-Menber has seemed significantly more liberal than either the pro-business Independent Bloc and Asalah, particularly in its opposition to proposed legislation that it argues would restrict freedom of assembly. In February 2006, Al-Menber led parliament's refusal to ratify the government's signature of the International Covenant on Civil and Political Rights, with the party's president, Dr Salah Alli, explaining, "[The Convention] means that Muslims could convert to another religion, something against the Islamic law." In the 2006 election they have worked out a deal with Asalah to avoid splitting the Sunni Islamist vote.

On the issue of women's political rights in Bahrain, Al-Menber MP Ali Ahmed told the Bahrain Tribune (26 January 2006):

In 2006's general election, the party promised to field several female candidates, with eye specialist Dr Haifa Al Mahmood apparently selected; however after an electoral pact was worked out with Asalah, which opposes women candidates, Al-Menber produced an all-male list of candidates. The party has though backed women's rights activists' campaign for the introduction of a unified personal status law, which was vehemently opposed by Shia Islamists.

Electoral history 
The group won three seats in the Bahraini Council of Representatives (parliament) in the 2002 election, seven seats at the 2006 election, but only two seats at the 2010 election and one seat at the 2014 election. It did not win any seats at the 2018 election.

Council of Representatives elections

See also
 Mohammed Khalid

References

External links
 Al-Menber official website
 Al-Eslah Society (parent organization)

Political parties in Bahrain
Sunni Islamic political parties
Political parties established in 2002
Muslim Brotherhood
Political parties with year of establishment missing
2002 establishments in Bahrain